The Louisville and Southwestern Railway was a 19th-century railway company in the U.S. state of Kentucky. It operated from  until , when it was incorporated into the Louisville Southern Railroad. It later made up part of the Southern Railway and its former rights-of-way currently form parts of the class-I Norfolk Southern system.

See also
 List of Kentucky railroads

Defunct Kentucky railroads
Defunct companies based in Louisville, Kentucky
Transportation in Louisville, Kentucky
Railway companies established in 1882
Railway companies disestablished in 1889